The West Lakes Classic was a golf tournament held in the Adelaide area of South Australia from 1975 to 1982. 

The event was historically sponsored by the Commercial Bank of Australia. In 1982 it was merged into a new bank called Westpac and the event was called the Westpac Classic in its final year. Prize money was A$20,000 in 1975, A$35,000 in 1976, A$50,000 in 1977, A$60,000 in 1978, A$65,000 in 1979, A$75,000 in 1980, A$80,000 in 1981 and A$100,000 in 1982. 

The event is perhaps best known as the site of Greg Norman's first professional victory. Norman still regards this as his most important win.

Winners

1 In 1981, Darcy won at the first extra hole.
2 In 1975, Shearer won at the third extra hole.

References

Former PGA Tour of Australasia events
Golf tournaments in Australia
Golf in South Australia
Recurring sporting events established in 1975
Recurring events disestablished in 1982